The second Sirisena cabinet was a central government of Sri Lanka led by President Maithripala Sirisena. It was formed in August 2015 after the parliamentary election and ended in October 2018 with the dismissal of Prime Minister Ranil Wickremesinghe, precipitating the 2018 constitutional crisis.

Cabinet members
Ministers appointed under article 43(1) of the constitution.

State ministers
Ministers appointed under article 44(1) of the constitution.

Deputy ministers
Ministers appointed under article 45(1) of the constitution.

Notes

References

2015 establishments in Sri Lanka
2018 disestablishments in Sri Lanka
Cabinets established in 2015
Cabinets disestablished in 2018
Cabinet of Sri Lanka
Maithripala Sirisena